Robert Edwin Firth (20 February 1887 – 1966) was an English footballer who played for Birmingham, Wellington Town, Nottingham Forest, Port Vale, and Southend United. He scored 22 goals from 242 appearances in the Football League. He later coached Spanish La Liga teams Racing de Santander and Real Madrid, leading Santander to a second-place finish in 1930–31 and Madrid to two Campeonato Regional Centro titles and to a first-place finish in La Liga in 1932–33 and a second-place finish in 1933–34.

Playing career
Firth played for Birmingham Corporation Transport and Golders Green before joining Birmingham. He played nine Second Division and FA Cup games in the 1909–10 season. He scored his first goal in the Football League on 10 December 1910, in a 1–0 win over Lincoln City at Sincil Bank, and went on to score two goals in 18 appearances in the 1910–11 campaign. After leaving St Andrew's he played for Wellington Town and Nottingham Forest, before joining Port Vale in June 1921 after serving in the Royal Field Artillery during the First World War. He claimed his first goal for the club on 29 August, in a 3–0 win over Clapton Orient at The Old Recreation Ground. He went on to score five goals in 39 Second Division games in the 1921–22 season, and was a member of the side which shared the North Staffordshire Infirmary Cup in 1922. However he was released at the end of the season and moved on to Southend United.

Coaching career
He coached Racing de Santander from 1930 to 1932. He led Santander to second in La Liga in 1930–31, behind champions Athletic Bilbao on goal difference. They went on to finish the 1931–32 season in fourth place. Firth then swapped the Estadio El Sardinero for Real Madrid. He spent two seasons in charge at Estadio Chamartín, leading Madrid to the league title in 1932–33, before leaving them after a second-place finish in 1933–34. He also led the club to two successive Campeonato Regional Centro victories. He also took Madrid to the 1933 final of the Copa del Presidente de la República, which ended in a 2–1 defeat to Athletic Bilbao at the Estadi Olímpic Lluís Companys.

Career statistics

Honours
Port Vale
North Staffordshire Infirmary Cup: 1922 (shared)

Real Madrid
La Liga: 1932–33
Campeonato Regional Centro: 1933, 1934

References

1887 births
Footballers from Birmingham, West Midlands
English footballers
English expatriate sportspeople in Spain
Association football midfielders
Birmingham City F.C. players
Telford United F.C. players
Nottingham Forest F.C. players
Port Vale F.C. players
Southend United F.C. players
English Football League players
English football managers
English expatriate football managers
Racing de Santander managers
Real Madrid CF managers
La Liga managers
Expatriate football managers in Spain
1966 deaths
British Army personnel of World War I
Royal Field Artillery soldiers
Date of death missing
Place of death missing